Sydney Max Kelly (27 November 1909 – 22 March 1987) was an Australian rules footballer who played with Geelong in the Victorian Football League (VFL).

Kelly, who came locally Geelong West, performed well in the 1930 VFL seconds season. He was joint winner of the Gardiner Medal, with Richmond's Selwyn Baker and was on a wing in Geelong's premiership team. This earned him promotion to the senior in 1931 and he made eight appearances that season, all in wins. He didn't feature in a senior game in 1932 but played 13 games in 1933.

References

1909 births
Australian rules footballers from Victoria (Australia)
Geelong Football Club players
Geelong West Football Club players
1987 deaths